Janet Khoo Kheng Hoon (born 6 Mac 1973), known as Janet Khoo, is a TV drama and film actress. She was born in Air Itam, Penang, and is of Malaysian Chinese and Peranakan descent. For the filem Paloh, she was nominated as Best Actress at the 17th Malaysian Film Festival.

Khoo first came to public attention in 1998 with her performance as a Vixen in the soap Idaman. Since then, she has been one of the few Chinese actresses who have made a name in the Malay entertainment scene, appearing in severaltelemovies as well as feature films such as Putera, Kad Cinta and Lurah Dendam.

Filmography

Films

Television

References

External links

Living people
1973 births
People from Penang
Peranakan people in Malaysia
Malaysian actresses
Malaysian film actresses